Emma Naluyima (born circa 1980) is a Ugandan veterinarian, urban farmer, businesswoman, elementary school educator and animal & crop farming instructor.

Early life and education
Naluyima was born circa 1980 in Entebbe, Uganda. Her father, Chris Kikwabanga, was an airline pilot and her mother, Margaret Nanziri, was a banker. Naluyima attended Stella Maris Primary School in Nkokonjeru, in Buikwe District. For her O-Level and A-Level studies, she attended Maryhill High School in the city of Mbarara. She was then admitted to Makerere University, Uganda's largest and oldest public university, graduating with a Bachelor of Veterinary Medicine degree. Later, she was awarded a Master of Health Services Research in Veterinary Medicine, by Makerere University.

Career
When Naluyima graduated with her BVM degree in 2004, the National Animal Genetic Resources Centre and Databank (Nagric), in Entebbe, offered her a full-time job, complete with a government house. After two years at Nagric, she resigned the salaried job, in August 2006 and went and started her first piggery, on a small family plot of land, with USh2 million (approximately US$1,000 at that time) of borrowed money. That piggery paid for her master's degree. In 2010, she married Ssalongo Washington Mugerwa, a school teacher. They bought  and Naluyima relocated her ten pigs to their new home.

Investments
Her current portfolio includes
(a) a plantation of matooke and vegetables, including tomatoes, spinach, cucumber, potatoes and greens. (b) A piggery of approximately 30 Camborough pigs. (c) Entebbe Animal Care Centre, a veterinary clinic. (d) An elementary school with approximately 300 students and 20 teachers. (e) A snail farm where snail glue is sold to cosmetic manufacturers. (f) She also keeps about one dozen dairy cows, a flock of chicken and four above-ground plastic fishponds stocked with tilapia and catfish. (g) Tours of her farm cost USh100,000 (approx. US$28) per head. She calls her farm One Acre Limited.

Awards
In September 2019, Emma Naluyima was a joint winner of the 2019 Africa Food Prize (formerly the Yara Prize). Her joint winner was Baba Dioum of Senegal. The two shared a US$100,000 cash prize.

Family
Emma Naluyima is married to Ssalongo Washington Mugerwa and together are the parents of four children, including a set of twin  firstborn daughters, born circa 2011.

See also
 Agriculture in Uganda
 Dairy industry in Uganda

References

Living people
Women veterinarians
Ugandan veterinarians
Ugandan biologists
Sustainability advocates
1980 births
20th-century Ugandan women scientists
21st-century Ugandan businesswomen
21st-century Ugandan businesspeople
21st-century Ugandan women scientists
21st-century Ugandan scientists
Urban farmers